The 2016 BetVictor World Matchplay was the 23rd annual staging of the World Matchplay, organised by the Professional Darts Corporation. The tournament took place at the Winter Gardens, Blackpool, from 16–24 July 2016.

Michael van Gerwen successfully defended his World Matchplay title by defeating Phil Taylor 18–10 in the final. It was the first (and would turn out to be, only) time that Taylor has been defeated in a World Matchplay final. Van Gerwen also became only the third player to successfully defend the Matchplay trophy after Taylor and Rod Harrington.

The second round was also reduced in length from best of 25 legs to best of 21 legs. This still remains the current format for the World Matchplay.

This tournament was the first time in the event's history that no matches went into 'extra legs', the first time that Taylor had been defeated in the final after winning his previous 15, and the first time that Robert Thornton won a match at the event. It was also the first time that James Wade was defeated before the World Matchplay quarter finals, after losing to Mervyn King in the first round.

Prize money
The prize fund remained at £450,000 as it has been since the 2014 event.

Format
In previous stagings of the event all games had to be won by two clear legs with no sudden-death legs. However, in 2013 after consulting the host broadcaster Sky Sports, the PDC decided that games will now only proceed for a maximum of six extra legs before a tie-break leg is required. For example, in a best of 19 legs first round match, if the score reaches 12–12 then the 25th leg will be the decider.

Qualification

PDC Order of Merit Top 16
  Michael van Gerwen (winner)
  Gary Anderson (semi-finals)
  Phil Taylor (runner-up)
  Adrian Lewis (semi-finals)
  Peter Wright (quarter-finals)
  James Wade (first round)
  Michael Smith (second round)
  Robert Thornton (second round)
  Dave Chisnall (quarter-finals)
  Jelle Klaasen (first round)
  Raymond van Barneveld (first round)
  Ian White (second round)
  Kim Huybrechts (first round)
  Stephen Bunting (first round)
  Terry Jenkins (second round)
  Vincent van der Voort (first round)

PDC ProTour qualifiers
  Benito van de Pas (first round)
  Mensur Suljović (second round)
  Gerwyn Price (second round)
  Alan Norris (first round)
  Simon Whitlock (first round)
  Joe Cullen (first round)
  Daryl Gurney (first round)
  Mervyn King (quarter-finals)
  Steve Beaton (quarter-finals)
  Justin Pipe (first round)
  Mark Webster (first round)
  Jamie Caven (first round)
  Kyle Anderson (second round)
  Brendan Dolan (second round)
  Josh Payne (first round)
  Robbie Green (first round)

Draw

References

External links
PDC Netzone, Schedule and results

World Matchplay (darts)
World Matchplay
World Matchplay